Clathrus cristatus is a species of fungus in the stinkhorn family. Found in Brazil, it was described as new to science in 2010.

References

Phallales
Fungi of Brazil
Fungi described in 2010